Frostproof Middle-High School or FMSHS is a combined middle school/high school located in Frostproof, Florida, serving the city of Frostproof and nearby areas.

Notable alumni
Alvin Harper, former NFL player
Travis Henry, former NFL player
Nickell Robey-Coleman, current NFL player for the Detroit Lions

See also 
 Polk County, Florida
 Polk County Public Schools

References

External links 
Frostproof Middle-Senior Website

High schools in Polk County, Florida
Public high schools in Florida
Public middle schools in Florida